Doug Leeds (born 16 May 1968), is the Chief Executive Officer of IAC Publishing, a digital media operating group launched on December 9, 2015, by media and Internet conglomerate IAC. The single digital media publisher reaches 100 million monthly uniques according to comScore October 2015 numbers and includes publishing brands About.com, The Daily Beast, Investopedia and Dictionary.com. Digital publishing is one of four key areas of strategic focus for IAC, as Leeds noted to the WSJ, saying that “bringing the sites under one umbrella will allow IAC to combine their strengths.” Leeds previously held the title of Ask.com CEO since 2010.

Biography

Career at Ask.com
Leeds was named CEO of Ask.com in 2010 following his tenure as president of the company. The previous CEO of Ask.com was Jim Safka.  Under Leeds's helm, Ask.com returned to its roots as a Q&A service, redesigned its site and launched an online community to generate human-powered answers  to supplement answers that are indexed from across the web. Leeds also focused the company on reaching mobile users, launching Ask.com mobile applications for web, iPhone  and Android as well as several well-received stand-alone applications that spun out of the Ask.com flagship experience. Ask.com mobile apps have been downloaded over one million times.

With the Ask.com product re-focused on Q&A, Leeds returned the brand to the TV airways, inking partnerships with Live with Kelly and airing new TV commercials that highlighted the Q&A value proposition.  The result of this product and marketing coordination has been greater than 25% user growth in the past year as well as a tripling of revenue and 700% increase in annual profits under Leeds's leadership.  IAC (company) CEO Greg Blatt stated about Leeds's management that "for the first time, maybe since we bought it, I think Ask is really hitting a stride."

Leeds has been a leading advocate of "Applied Improv" as a business tool to foster creativity and innovation. Under Leeds's direction, all Ask.com employees have been trained in using improv techniques to enhance their communications, identify new opportunities and accept a more diverse set of business possibilities.

Prior to assuming the top role at Ask, Leeds served as the company's chief operating officer, chief strategy officer, and SVP of Products where the products he launched won multiple Webby Awards and were heralded as the "Apple of search" by Chris Sherman of Search Engine Land
 
In addition to running Ask.com, Leeds now also oversees a publishing network of informational, evergreen content aimed at helping people learn new things and includes About.com, Investopedia, Ask.com, Dictionary.com.

Purchase of ASKfm
In August 2014, Leeds also spearheaded Ask.com's acquisition of ASKfm, a global social network with 150 million users across 150 countries. ASKfm generates an estimated 20,000 questions per minute with approximately 45 percent of its mobile monthly active users logging in daily. To date, the mobile app has been downloaded more than 40 million times. Leeds has been active champion in spearheading the safety overhaul of ASKfm, proactively driving partnerships with New York and Maryland Attorneys General to design specific safety plans and relocating the company out of Latvia, to Dublin Ireland where he has forged partnerships with local government and children's ministries to ensure the site is up to industry safety standards.

Career at Dictionary.com
Immediately prior to leading Ask.com, Leeds was the President and chief executive officer of Dictionary.com, a top 50 website in the US. Leeds took over management of Dictionary.com following IAC's acquisition of the company in 2008, which Leeds spearheaded.  Under Leeds's direction, Dictionary.com entered the mobile market, launching the Dictionary.com mobile app on all major mobile platforms, resulting in over 40 million app downloads and recognition by Apple, in March 2012, as one of the 25 most downloaded apps of all time. Under Leeds, revenue at Dictionary.com grew 75% and profit rose over 150%.

Leeds also oversaw the successful launch of several Dictionary.com mobile games including Miss Spell's Class and Agent X Word.

Other business experience
Leeds has worked in various capacities at additional companies including Yahoo (VP, Product Justice), Overture Services (Senior Director, Trust and Community), OmniSky (Director of Wireless Advertising), BootSpace (CEO), Vodafone (Director, Public Policy), Thelen (Associate Attorney, Antitrust), Carnegie Endowment for International Peace (Fellow), and the Arms Control Association (Researcher).  He has served on the board of directors of TRUSTe and the Mobile Marketing Association.

Personal biography

Born and raised in Los Angeles, California, Leeds is the grandson of Joseph Friedman, inventor of the flexible straw.  He attended high school at Crossroads School before receiving his bachelor's degree cum laude from University of California, Berkeley in 1992.  He graduated with high honors in Political Economy and served as the department's valedictorian.  He earned his juris doctor cum laude in 1996 from the Georgetown University Law Center where he was an editor of the Georgetown Law Journal. In 1994, Leeds married Tracy Porter. They have three daughters. Leeds and his family live in Danville, California.

References

1968 births
Living people
American technology chief executives
Georgetown University Law Center alumni
University of California, Berkeley alumni
People from Danville, California
American chief operating officers
Crossroads School alumni